Elizabeth Spencer Allman (born 1965) is an American mathematician. She is a professor of mathematics in the Department of Mathematics and Statistics at the University of Alaska Fairbanks; her research interests range from abstract algebra and algebraic statistics to biomathematics and phylogeny.

Education
Allman earned her Ph.D. in 1995 from the University of California, Los Angeles under the supervision of Murray M. Schacher. Her dissertation, in abstract algebra, was Polynomials Without Roots in Division Algebras.

Contributions
With her Fairbanks colleague John A. Rhodes, Allman is the author of a book on mathematical biology and mathematical modeling, Mathematical Models in Biology: An Introduction (Cambridge University Press, 2004).

Recognition
In 2012, Allman became a Fellow of the American Mathematical Society.

References

External links
Elizabeth S. Allman Home page

Living people
1965 births
American women mathematicians
20th-century American mathematicians
21st-century American mathematicians
Fellows of the American Mathematical Society
University of California, Los Angeles alumni
University of Alaska Fairbanks faculty
Mathematicians from Alaska
20th-century women mathematicians
21st-century women mathematicians
20th-century American women
21st-century American women